MRT Line 2 may refer to:
 Manila Light Rail Transit System Line 2, a rapid transit line in Manila, Philippines
 Putrajaya Line (SSP Line), a rapid transit line in Malaysia
 MRT Line 2, a rapid transit line in Jakarta, Indonesia